Denmark first participated at the FINA World Aquatics Championships at the third championships in 1978 when it was held in West Berlin, and has participated in every championships since then.

Medalists
Lotte Friis is the most winning Danish swimmer at the Championships, with two gold medals and four silver medals. Nine women and two men from Denmark have received at least one medal, all won in the swimming events.

Medals by championships
The most successful championships for Denmark by gold medal count was the 2011 championships, while the most total medals were achieved in 2013 and 2015.

Footnotes

References

 
Nations at the World Aquatics Championships